Rinzia sessilis is a plant species of the family Myrtaceae endemic to Western Australia.

It blooms in September producing pink-white flowers.

It is found on undulating flats and low ridges in the southern Wheatbelt and Goldfields-Esperance regions of Western Australia where it grows in sandy-clay or loamy soils with gravel.

References

sessilis
Endemic flora of Western Australia
Myrtales of Australia
Rosids of Western Australia
Plants described in 1986